Poręba is a town in Silesian Voivodeship, south Poland.

Poręba may also refer to:
Poręba, Pszczyna County in Silesian Voivodeship (south Poland)
Poręba, Greater Poland Voivodeship (west-central Poland)
Poręba, Lesser Poland Voivodeship (south Poland)
Poręba, Łódź Voivodeship (central Poland)
Poręba, Lower Silesian Voivodeship (south-west Poland)
Poręba, Masovian Voivodeship (east-central Poland)
Poręba, Świętokrzyskie Voivodeship (south-central Poland)
Poręba, Lubusz Voivodeship (west Poland)
Poręba, Gmina Leśnica in Opole Voivodeship (south-west Poland)
Poręba, Pomeranian Voivodeship (north Poland)
Polish name for Poruba (Orlová), a former village now part of Orlová, Czech Republic